Tenida is a Bengali comedy adventure film directed by Chinmoy Roy and produced by Tower Solar System loosely based on a Tenida novel Charmurtir Abhijan by Narayan Gangopadhyay. This film was released in 2011. Director Roy himself played the part of Tenida in Charmurti in 1978.

Plot
Tenida and his three friends Kyabla, Habul and Palaram are invited by uncle Kutty Mama for a visit to the jungles of Dooars in vacation. They go to Dooars and realise that poacher stealing the trees and animals of the forest. There are some terrorists also active inside the jungle. Tenida and his friends solve the problems.

Cast
 Chinmoy Roy as Elephant doctor
 Subhasish Mukherjee as Tenida
 Biplab Chatterjee as Police inspector
 Bibhu Bhattacharya as Seth Dhundhuram
 Jui Banerjee
 Gaurav Dasgupta
 Ritam Bose
 Moinak Dutta
 Sreemonti Majumdar
 Tapas Chakraborty
 Gora Chowdhury

References

2011 films
Indian children's films
2010s adventure comedy films
Films based on Indian novels
Indian adventure comedy films
Bengali-language Indian films
2010s Bengali-language films
2011 comedy films
Films based on works by Narayan Gangopadhyay

External links